Ssangyong(Korea Nazarene Univ.) Station is a station on Line 1 of the Seoul Metropolitan Subway. It was opened in December 2008.

It is the closest station to Korea Nazarene University.

References

External links
 Station information from Korail

Seoul Metropolitan Subway stations
Railway stations opened in 2008
Metro stations in Cheonan